In Greek mythology, Tyrimmas was a King of Dodona in Epirus. His daughter Euippe bore Odysseus a son, Euryalus, who was later mistakenly slain by his father.

Notes

Epirotic mythology

References 

 Parthenius, Love Romances translated by Sir Stephen Gaselee (1882-1943), S. Loeb Classical Library Volume 69. Cambridge, MA. Harvard University Press. 1916.  Online version at the Topos Text Project.
 Parthenius, Erotici Scriptores Graeci, Vol. 1. Rudolf Hercher. in aedibus B. G. Teubneri. Leipzig. 1858. Greek text available at the Perseus Digital Library.

Characters in Greek mythology